Cedar Lake Contemporary Ballet was a New York City-based contemporary ballet company.

Cedar Lake Contemporary Ballet was founded in 2003 by Nancy Walton Laurie. It had sixteen dancers.

Cedar Lake offered a wide-ranging repertory, including works by Alexander Ekman, Jiří Kylián, Hofesh Shechter, Crystal Pite, Jacopo Godani, Angelin Preljocaj, Ohad Naharin, Didy Veldman, Jo Strømgren, Regina van Berkel and Sidi Larbi Cherkaoui.

Cedar Lake is featured in the 2011 film The Adjustment Bureau, including original choreography for the film's co-star Emily Blunt.

On March 20, 2015, artistic director Alexandra Damiani announced to the troupe that the company would close.  The company concluded at Brooklyn Academy of Music in June, 2015 with a final world premiere by Richard Siegal.

Artistic staff 

 Alexandra Damiani, Artistic Director
 Crystal Pite, Associate Choreographer
Benoit-Swan Pouffer, Artistic Director (previous to Damiani)

Dancers included

Justin Peck
Jubal Battiste
Jolene Baldini
Jon Bond
Patrick Coker (apprentice)
Nickemil Concepcion
Soojin Choi
Vânia Doutel Vaz
Daphne Fernberger (apprentice)
Gwynenn Taylor Jones
Jessica Lee Keller
Jason Kittleburger
Joseph Kudra
Ana-Maria Lucaciu
Navarra Novy-Williams
Raymond Pinto
Guillaume Quéau
Matthew Rich
Ida Saki
Joaquim de Santana
Acacia Schachte
Billy Bell
Rachelle Scott
Jessica Coleman Scott
Harumi Terayama
Kristen Weiser
Ebony Williams
Jin Young Won
Madeline Wong

References

External links 

Cedar Lake project 52
Archival footage of Cedar Lake Contemporary Ballet performing at the Jacob's Pillow Dance Festival in 2009
Archival footage of Cedar Lake Contemporary Ballet performing Jo Strømgren's Necessity, Again in 2013 at Jacob’s Pillow Dance Festival.

Dance companies in New York City
Ballet companies in the United States
Performing groups established in 2003
Walton family
2003 establishments in New York City
2015 disestablishments in New York (state)
Performing groups disestablished in 2015
Contemporary theatre
Contemporary dance
Contemporary music